The Kingdom of Sardinia, also referred to as the Kingdom of Sardinia-Piedmont or Piedmont-Sardinia during the Savoyard period, was a state in Southern Europe from the early 14th until the mid-19th century.

In 1720, the island was ceded by the Habsburg and Bourbon claimants to the Spanish throne to the Duke of Savoy, Victor Amadeus II. The Savoyards united it with their historical possessions on the Italian peninsula, and the kingdom came to be progressively identified with the peninsular states, which included, besides Savoy and Aosta, dynastic possessions like the Principality of Piedmont and the County of Nice, over both of which the Savoyards had been exercising their control since the 13th century and 1388, respectively.

The formal name of this composite state was the "States of His Majesty the King of Sardinia", and is also referred to as Sardinia-Piedmont, Piedmont-Sardinia, or erroneously the Kingdom of Piedmont, since the island of Sardinia had always been of secondary importance to the monarchy. Under Savoyard rule, the kingdom's government, ruling class, cultural models and center of population were entirely situated in the peninsula. Therefore, while the capital of the island of Sardinia and the seat of its viceroys had always been de jure Cagliari, it was the Piedmontese city of Turin, the capital of Savoy since the mid 16th century, which was the de facto seat of power. This situation would be conferred official status with the Perfect Fusion of 1847, when all the kingdom's governmental institutions would be centralized in Turin.

When the peninsular domains of the House of Savoy were occupied and eventually annexed by Napoleonic France, the king of Sardinia temporarily resided on the island for the first time in Sardinia's history under Savoyard rule. The Congress of Vienna (1814–15), which restructured Europe after Napoleon's defeat, returned to Savoy its peninsular possessions and augmented them with Liguria, taken from the Republic of Genoa. Following Geneva’s accession to Switzerland, the Treaty of Turin (1816) transferred Carouge and adjacent areas to the newly-created Swiss Canton of Geneva. In 1847–48, through an act of Union analogous to the one between Great Britain and Ireland, the various Savoyard states were unified under one legal system with their capital in Turin, and granted a constitution, the Statuto Albertino.

By the time of the Crimean War in 1853, the Savoyards had built the kingdom into a strong power. There followed the annexation of Lombardy (1859), the central Italian states and the Two Sicilies (1860), Venetia (1866), and the Papal States (1870). On 17 March 1861, to more accurately reflect its new geographic, cultural and political extent, the Kingdom of Sardinia changed its name to the Kingdom of Italy, and its capital was eventually moved first to Florence and then to Rome. The Savoy-led Kingdom of Piedmont-Sardinia was thus the legal predecessor of the Kingdom of Italy, which in turn is the predecessor of the present-day Italian Republic.

Exchange of Sardinia for Sicily 

The Spanish domination of Sardinia ended at the beginning of the 18th century, as a result of the War of the Spanish succession. By the Treaty of Utrecht of 1713, Spain's European empire was divided: Savoy received Sicily and parts of the Duchy of Milan, while Charles VI (the Holy Roman Emperor and Archduke of Austria), received the Spanish Netherlands, the Kingdom of Naples, Sardinia, and the bulk of the Duchy of Milan.

During the War of the Quadruple Alliance, Victor Amadeus II, Duke of Savoy and Prince of Piedmont (and now King of Sicily too), had to agree to yield Sicily to the Austrian Habsburgs and receive Sardinia in exchange. The exchange was formally ratified in the Treaty of The Hague of 17 February 1720. Because the Kingdom of Sardinia had existed since the 14th century, the exchange allowed Victor Amadeus to retain the title of king in spite of the loss of Sicily.

Victor Amadeus initially resisted the exchange, and until 1723 continued to style himself King of Sicily rather than King of Sardinia. The state took the official title of Kingdom of Sardinia, Cyprus and Jerusalem, as the house of Savoy still claimed the thrones of Cyprus and Jerusalem, although both had long been under Ottoman rule.

In 1767–1769, Charles Emmanuel III annexed the Maddalena archipelago in the Strait of Bonifacio from the Republic of Genoa and claimed it as part of Corsica. Since then the archipelago has been a part of the Sardinian region.

Early history of Savoy 

During the 3rd century BC, the Allobroges settled down in the region between the Rhône and the Alps. This region, named Allobrigia and later "Sapaudia" in Latin, was integrated to the Roman Empire. In the 5th century, the region of Savoy was ceded by the Western Roman Empire to the Burgundians and became part of the Kingdom of Burgundy.

Piedmont was inhabited in early historic times by Celto-Ligurian tribes such as the Taurini and the Salassi. They later submitted to the Romans (c. 220 BC), who founded several colonies there including Augusta Taurinorum (Turin) and Eporedia (Ivrea). After the fall of the Western Roman Empire, the region was repeatedly invaded by the Burgundians, the Goths (5th century), Byzantines, Lombards (6th century), and the Franks (773). At the time Piedmont, as part of the Kingdom of Italy within the Holy Roman Empire, was subdivided into several marks and counties.

In 1046, Oddo of Savoy added Piedmont to their main segment of Savoy, with a capital at Chambéry (now in France). Other areas remained independent, such as the powerful communes of Asti and Alessandria, and the marquisates of Saluzzo and Montferrat. The County of Savoy was elevated to a duchy in 1416, and Duke Emmanuel Philibert moved the seat to Turin in 1563.

Napoleonic Wars and the Congress of Vienna 
In 1792, the Kingdom of Sardinia and the other states of the Savoy Crown joined the First Coalition against the French First Republic, but was beaten in 1796 by Napoleon and forced to conclude the disadvantageous Treaty of Paris (1796), giving the French army free passage through Piedmont. On 6 December 1798 Joubert occupied Turin and forced Charles Emmanuel IV to abdicate and leave for the island of Sardinia. The provisionary government voted to unite Piedmont with France. In 1799 the Austro-Russians briefly occupied the city, but with the Battle of Marengo (1800), the French regained control. The island of Sardinia, having defeated the armies of the French expedition to Sardinia without the royal army's help, stayed out of the reach of the French for the rest of the war. 

Thus, Sardinia became the first European country to have engaged in a revolution of its own, the episode not being the result of a foreign military importation like in most of Europe.

In 1814, the Crown of Savoy enlarged its territories with the addition of the former Republic of Genoa, now a duchy, and it served as a buffer state against France. This was confirmed by the Congress of Vienna, which returned the region of Savoy to its borders after it had been annexed by France in 1792. By the Treaty of Stupinigi, the Kingdom of Sardinia extended its protectorate over the Principality of Monaco.

In the reaction after Napoleon, the country was ruled by conservative monarchs: Victor Emmanuel I (1802–21), Charles Felix (1821–31) and Charles Albert (1831–49), who fought at the head of a contingent of his own troops at the Battle of Trocadero, which set the reactionary Ferdinand VII on the Spanish throne. Victor Emanuel I disbanded the entire Code Napoléon and returned the lands and power to the nobility and the Church. This reactionary policy went as far as discouraging the use of roads built by the French. These changes typified Sardinia.

The Kingdom of Sardinia industrialized from 1830 onward. A constitution, the Statuto Albertino, was enacted in the year of revolutions, 1848 under liberal pressure. In the same year the island of Sardinia, a Piedmontese dependency for more than a century, lost its own residual autonomy to the peninsula through the so-called Perfect fusion issued by Charles Albert; as a result, the kingdom's fundamental institutions were deeply transformed, assuming the shape of a constitutional and centralized monarchy on the French model; under the same pressure, Charles Albert declared war on Austria. After initial success, the war took a turn for the worse and Charles Albert was defeated by Marshal Radetzky at the Battle of Custozza (1848).

Savoyard struggle for the Italian unification 

Like all the various duchies and city-states on the Apennine peninsula and associated islands, the Kingdom of Sardinia was troubled with political instability under alternating governments. After a short and disastrous renewal of the war with Austria in 1849, Charles Albert abdicated on 23 March 1849 in favour of his son Victor Emmanuel II.

In 1852, a liberal ministry under Count Camillo Benso di Cavour was installed and the Kingdom of Sardinia became the engine driving Italian unification. The Kingdom of Sardinia took part in the Crimean War, allied with the Ottoman Empire, Britain, and France, and fighting against Russia.

In 1859, France sided with the Kingdom of Sardinia in a war against Austria, the Austro-Sardinian War. Napoleon III did not keep his promises to Cavour to fight until all of the Kingdom of Lombardy–Venetia had been conquered. Following the bloody battles of Magenta and Solferino, both French victories, Napoleon thought the war too costly to continue and made a separate peace behind Cavour's back in which only Lombardy would be ceded.

Due to the Austrian government's refusal to cede any lands to the Kingdom of Sardinia, they agreed to cede Lombardy to Napoleon, who in turn then ceded the territory to the Kingdom of Sardinia to avoid "embarrassing" the defeated Austrians. Cavour angrily resigned from office when it became clear that Victor Emmanuel would accept this arrangement.

Garibaldi and the Thousand 
On 5 March 1860, Piacenza, Parma, Tuscany, Modena, and Romagna voted in referendums to join the Kingdom of Sardinia. This alarmed Napoleon, who feared a strong Savoyard state on his south-eastern border and he insisted that if the Kingdom of Sardinia were to keep the new acquisitions they would have to cede Savoy and Nice to France. This was done through the Treaty of Turin, which also called for referendums to confirm the annexation. Subsequently, somewhat controversial referendums showed over 99.5% majorities in both areas in favour of joining France.

In 1860, Giuseppe Garibaldi started his campaign to conquer the southern Apennines in the name of the Kingdom of Sardinia. He quickly toppled the Kingdom of the Two Sicilies, which was the largest of the states in the region, stretching from Abruzzo and Naples on the peninsula to Messina and Palermo on Sicily. He then marched to Gaeta in the central peninsula. Cavour was satisfied with the unification, while Garibaldi, who was too revolutionary for the king and his prime minister, wanted to conquer Rome as well.

Garibaldi was disappointed in this development, as well as in the loss of his home province, Nice, to France. He also failed to fulfill the promises that had gained him popular and military support by the Sicilians: that the new nation would be a republic, not a kingdom, and that the Sicilians would see great economic gains after unification. The former did not come to pass until 1946.

Towards the Kingdom of Italy 
On 17 March 1861, law no. 4671 of the Sardinian Parliament proclaimed the Kingdom of Italy, so ratifying the annexations of all other Apennine states, plus Sicily, to the Kingdom of Sardinia. The institutions and laws of the kingdom were quickly extended to all of Italy, abolishing the administrations of the other regions. Piedmont became the most dominant and wealthiest region in Italy and the capital of Piedmont, Turin, remained the Italian capital until 1865, when the capital was moved to Florence. But many revolts exploded throughout the peninsula, especially in southern Italy, and on the island of Sicily, because of the perceived unfair treatment of the south by the Piedmontese ruling class. The House of Savoy ruled Italy until 1946, when Italy was declared a republic by referendum. The result was 54.3% in favor of the Republic.

Currency 
The currency in use in Savoy was the Piedmontese scudo. During the Napoleonic era, it was replaced in general circulation by the French franc. In 1816, after regaining their peninsular domains, the scudo was replaced by the Sardinian lira, which in 1821 also replaced the Sardinian scudo, the coins that had been in use on the island throughout the period.

Flags, royal standards and coats of arms 

When the Duchy of Savoy acquired the Kingdom of Sicily in 1713 and the Kingdom of Sardinia in 1723, the flag of Savoy became the flag of a naval power. This posed the problem that the same flag was already in use by the Knights of Malta. Because of this, the Savoyards modified their flag for use as a naval ensign in various ways, adding the letters FERT in the four cantons, or adding a blue border, or using a blue flag with the Savoy cross in one canton.

Eventually, King Charles Albert of Savoy adopted the "revolutionary" Italian tricolor, surmounted by the Savoyard shield, as his flag. This flag would later become the flag of the Kingdom of Italy, and the tricolor without the Savoyard escutcheon remains the flag of Italy.

References:

Maps

Territorial evolution of the Kingdom of Sardinia from 1796 to 1860

See also 

 List of monarchs of Sardinia
 List of viceroys of Sardinia
 Spanish Empire
 S'hymnu sardu nationale
 Kingdom of Sardinia (1324–1720)
 Kingdom of Sardinia (1700–1720)

Notes and references

Footnotes

Notes

Bibliography 

 Antonicelli, Aldo. "From Galleys to Square Riggers: The modernization of the navy of the Kingdom of Sardinia." The Mariner's Mirror 102.2 (2016): 153–173 online.
 
 Luttwak Edward, The Grand Strategy of the Byzantine Empire, The Belknap Press, 2009, 
 
 
 Romani, Roberto. "The Reason of the Elites: Constitutional Moderatism in the Kingdom of Sardinia, 1849–1861." in Sensibilities of the Risorgimento (Brill, 2018) pp. 192–244.
 Romani, Roberto. "Reluctant Revolutionaries: Moderate Liberalism in the Kingdom of Sardinia, 1849–1859." Historical Journal (2012): 45–73. online
 Schena, Olivetta. "The role played by towns in parliamentary commissions in the kingdom of Sardinia in the fifteenth and sixteenth centuries." Parliaments, Estates and Representation 39.3 (2019): 304–315.
 Smith, Denis Mack. Victor Emanuel, Cavour and the Risorgimento (Oxford UP, 1971) online.
 
  old interpretations but useful on details; vol 1 goes to 1859]; volume 2 online covers 1859–62

In Italian 

 AAVV. (a cura di F. Manconi), La società sarda in età spagnola, Cagliari, Consiglio Regionale della Sardegna, 2 voll., 1992-3
 Blasco Ferrer Eduardo, Crestomazia Sarda dei primi secoli, collana Officina Linguistica, Ilisso, Nuoro, 2003, 
 Boscolo Alberto, La Sardegna bizantina e alto giudicale, Edizioni Della TorreCagliari 1978
 Casula Francesco Cesare, La storia di Sardegna, Carlo Delfino Editore, Sassari, 1994, 
 Coroneo Roberto, Arte in Sardegna dal IV alla metà dell'XI secolo, edizioni AV, Cagliari, 2011
 Coroneo Roberto, Scultura mediobizantina in Sardegna, Nuoro, Poliedro, 2000,
 Gallinari Luciano, Il Giudicato di Cagliari tra XI e XIII secolo. Proposte di interpretazioni istituzionali, in Rivista dell'Istituto di Storia dell'Europa Mediterranea, n°5, 2010
 Manconi Francesco, La Sardegna al tempo degli Asburgo, Il Maestrale, Nuoro, 2010, 
 Manconi Francesco, Una piccola provincia di un grande impero, CUEC, Cagliari, 2012, 
 Mastino Attilio, Storia della Sardegna Antica, Il Maestrale, Nuoro, 2005, 
 Meloni Piero, La Sardegna Romana, Chiarella, Sassari, 1980
 Motzo Bachisio Raimondo, Studi sui bizantini in Sardegna e sull'agiografia sarda, Deputazione di Storia Patria della Sardegna, Cagliari, 1987
 Ortu Gian Giacomo, La Sardegna dei Giudici, Il Maestrale, Nuoro, 2005, 
 Paulis Giulio, Lingua e cultura nella Sardegna bizantina: testimonianze linguistiche dell'influsso greco, Sassari, L'Asfodelo, 1983
 Spanu Luigi, Cagliari nel seicento, Edizioni Castello, Cagliari, 1999
 Zedda Corrado – Pinna Raimondo, La nascita dei Giudicati. Proposta per lo scioglimento di un enigma storiografico, in Archivio Storico Giuridico di Sassari, seconda serie, n° 12, 2007

 
Former countries in Europe

Viceroyalties of the Spanish Empire
1324 establishments in Europe
1861 disestablishments in Italy
States and territories established in 1324
States and territories disestablished in 1861
History of Sardinia
Former countries
Former monarchies of Europe
Island countries
Sardinia